Western Springs is a station on Metra's BNSF Line in Western Springs, Illinois. In Metra's zone-based fare system, Western Springs is in zone D. As of 2018, Western Springs is the 38th busiest of Metra's 236 non-downtown stations, with an average of 1,134 weekday boardings. There is a staffed station building. During the spring and summer of 2008 the north platform of the station was rebuilt to match the architecture of the station building.

References

External links 

Station from Wolf Road from Google Maps Street View

Metra stations in Illinois
Former Chicago, Burlington and Quincy Railroad stations
Railway stations in Cook County, Illinois